Sir David Petrie  (9 September 1879 – 7 August 1961) was Director General (DG) of MI5, the United Kingdom's internal security service, from 1941 to 1946.

Biography
Petrie worked in the Indian Imperial Police between 1900 and 1936. His highest level in British India was to chair the Union Public Service Commission. In April 1941, he was appointed Director General of MI5. His task was to reorganise the service so that it could improve its efficiency. In the spring of 1946, Petrie retired.

He was awarded Order of the Yugoslav Crown and other decorations.

References

Notes

Sources
 R. Popplewell, Intelligence and imperial defence: British intelligence and the defence of the Indian empire, 1904–1924, 1995, 
 F. H. Hinsley and C. A. G. Simkins, British intelligence in the Second World War, 4: Security and counter-intelligence, 1990
 D. Petrie, Communism in India, 1924–27, 1972
 T. Bower, The perfect English spy: Sir Dick White and the secret war, 1935–90, 1995

1879 births
1961 deaths
Directors General of MI5
Commanders of the Order of the British Empire
Commanders of the Royal Victorian Order
Companions of the Order of the Indian Empire
Knights Commander of the Order of St Michael and St George
Indian Police Service officers in British India
Intelligence Corps officers
British military personnel of the 1936–1939 Arab revolt in Palestine
People from Banffshire
Officers of the Order of Orange-Nassau
Knights of Grace of the Order of St John
Colonial recipients of the Queen's Police Medal
Scottish recipients of the Queen's Police Medal
Recipients of the Order of the Yugoslav Crown